Belur Math railway station is a terminal railway station of the Kolkata Suburban Railway network, which connects Belur Math, temple and the headquarters of the Ramakrishna Math and Mission, with Howrah via the Eastern main line of Eastern Railway.

Nearby places of interest 
The Belur Math which is the headquarters of the Ramkrishna Mission and a leading tourist and pilgrimage destination for people across the world, is located on the banks of river Ganga, at a distance of about 1.5  km from the station. It was established by Swami Vivekananda in the year 1938 and also contains the Samadhi of the great Saint and youth icon along with that of Sarada Devi and Ramakrishna Paramahamsa.

See also 
 Kolkata Suburban Railway

References 

Railway stations in Howrah district
Kolkata Suburban Railway stations